The serrulate whiptail or serrulate rattail, Coryphaenoides serrulatus, is a rattail of the genus Coryphaenoides, found around southern Australia and New Zealand, at depths of between 750 and 2,000 m.  Its length is between 30 and 45 cm.

References
 
 Tony Ayling & Geoffrey Cox, Collins Guide to the Sea Fishes of New Zealand,  (William Collins Publishers Ltd, Auckland, New Zealand 1982) 

Macrouridae
Fish described in 1878
Taxa named by Albert Günther